Blondie's Reward is a 1948 American comedy film directed by Abby Berlin and starring Penny Singleton, Arthur Lake, Larry Simms, and Marjorie Ann Mutchie. It is the twenty-third of the 28 Blondie films.

Plot
Dagwood purchases the wrong real estate property and Mr. Dithers promptly demotes him to office boy. Dagwood's substitute is sent to deliver blueprints to the estate home of a wealthy client, Mr. Dixon, and gets into a fistfight with Dixon's unwanted son-in-law.  The delighted Dixon mistakenly thinks the substitute was Dagwood, and asks Dagwood for a personal boxing lesson, as a pleased Mr. Dithers restores Dagwood to his former position.  Meanwhile, two swindlers come to the Bumstead's house to have him sign over a deed to what Dagwood doesn't realize is a valuable property.  Alexander and his friend had overheard the swindlers plotting, and they try to interrupt the transaction, but are shooed away and have to take comical measures to stop the signing.

Cast
 Penny Singleton as Blondie
 Arthur Lake as Dagwood
 Larry Simms as Baby Dumpling
 Marjorie Ann Mutchie as Cookie
 Daisy as Daisy the Dog
 Jerome Cowan as Mr. Radcliffe
 Gay Nelson as Alice
 Ross Ford as Ted Scott
 Danny Mummert as Alvin Fuddle
 Paul Harvey as John D. Dickson
 Frank Jenks as Ed Vance
 Chick Chandler as Bill Cooper
 Jack Rice as Ollie Merton
 Eddie Acuff as Mr. Johnson
 Frank Sully as Officer Carney
 Myron Healey as Cluett Day
 Chester Clute as Leroy J. Blodgett

References

External links
 
 
 
 

1948 films
Columbia Pictures films
American black-and-white films
Blondie (film series) films
1948 comedy films
American comedy films
Films directed by Abby Berlin
1940s American films